Sandra Tewkesbury (February 14, 1942 – June 5, 1962) was a Canadian figure skater who competed in ladies singles. Tewkesbury was born in Chatham, Ontario.  She won the bronze medal at the 1959 Canadian Figure Skating Championships and competed at the 1960 Winter Olympics.

She died following a car accident in Guelph in June 1962.

Results

References

1942 births
1962 deaths
Canadian female single skaters
Figure skaters at the 1960 Winter Olympics
Olympic figure skaters of Canada
Sportspeople from Chatham-Kent